Margit Bara (21 June 1928 – 25 October 2016) was a Hungarian film actress. She appeared in 25 films between 1956 and 1975. She retired from acting in 1977 and later in 1992 received the Order of Merit of the Republic of Hungary and in 2002 she was awarded the Kossuth Prize.

Selected filmography
 Drama of the Lark (1963)
 A Cozy Cottage (1963)
 Jacob the Liar (1975)

References

External links

1928 births
2016 deaths
Hungarian film actresses
Actors from Cluj-Napoca
20th-century Hungarian actresses